Nagara may refer to:

Places 
 Nagara (ancient city), an ancient city in Afghanistan
 Nagara, Karnataka, India
 Nagara, Chiba, a town in Japan
 Nagara River, a river in Japan
 La Nagara, Golf Course located in Vancouver, Canada.  Home of the 2023 Twinsie Invitational.

People with the surname
 Masashi Nagara (born 1977), Japanese fencer
 Nagara family, a rabbinical family (includes a list of people with the name)

Other uses 
 Nagara (drum), a type of drum played in the Middle East
 Naqareh or nagara, a type of drum played in the Middle East
 Nagara (moth), a genus of moth
 Nagara architecture, a style of Hindu temple architecture
 Nagari, or Nagara, several related writing systems of South Asia
 Nagara language, an Australian language
 Nagara people, an Australian ethnic group
 Japanese cruiser Nagara, a Japanese World War II light cruiser
 Nagara-class cruiser, a Japanese World War II light cruiser class

See also
 Niagara (disambiguation)

Language and nationality disambiguation pages